Associazione Sportiva Roma (lit. Rome Sport Association), commonly referred to as simply Roma or Roma Femminile and Roma Women, is an Italian women's association football club based in Roma, section of the homonymous professional football club. It was established in 2018 by acquiring the Serie A license of a Res Roma. The team competes in Serie A and debuted in 2018–19 season.

History 
Res Roma competed in the Serie A since 2003 but chose to hand over their competition license at the end of the 2017-18 Serie A season, allowing A.S. Roma to take over the license and begin life as a club in the top tier. The team's best finish in Serie A is 2nd place, achieved in the 2021-2022 Season.

The club conquered its first major trophy in the 2020-21 season when Roma won the 2021 Coppa Italia. Betty Bavagnoli worked as the club's head coach during the first three seasons of A.S. Roma's existence, later taking up the job of Head of Women's Football at the club. She was succeeded as head coach of the Roma senior squad by Alessandro Spugna. The club's first-ever captain is Italian and Roman defender Elisa Bartoli. Roma played the  final on 22 May 2022, losing to Juventus for 2-1.

Players

Current squad

Youth players

Out on loan

Captains
  Elisa Bartoli (2018-)

Former players

Honours
Coppa Italia
Winners (1): 2020–21

Supercoppa Italiana
Winners (1): 2022

See also 
 List of women's association football clubs
 List of women's football clubs in Italy

References

External links 

  

 
Women's football clubs in Italy
Football clubs in Rome
2018 establishments in Italy
Association football clubs established in 2018
Serie A (women's football) clubs